National RTI Forum  was an organisation based in Lucknow, Uttar Pradesh, India, founded by ex IPS officers and President, Adhikar Sena Amitabh Thakur and his wife activist and advocate Nutan Thakur.

Background
The group gave "RTI Gallantry Award"s named after murdered RTI activists Satish Shetty, Shashidhar Mishra and Lalit Mehta for some years. In 2010 the awards were given for the first time to a slain RTI activist Amit Jethwa, a forest officer Sanjiv Chaturvedi and an environmentalist Biswajit Mohanty. The awards have no monetary value.

References

External links
 Official Website

Right to Information in India
Organisations based in Lucknow
2010 establishments in Uttar Pradesh
Organizations established in 2010